The Aston Martin Heritage Trust  (AMHT) is a Charitable Incorporated Organisation that manages the Aston Martin Museum an automobile museum presenting the history of Aston Martin cars. It is located off Dorchester Road in the village of Drayton St Leonard, South Oxfordshire, England.

The AMHT was founded in 1998 and the Museum opened in 2002.
It is housed in a 15th-century barn, built by the monks of Dorchester Abbey. The collection ranges from the oldest surviving Aston Martin car, No. 3 to a Vanquish Volante pre-production model dating from 2013.

See also
 Museum of Oxford
 List of museums in Oxfordshire

References

External links
 Museum website

1998 establishments in England
Organizations established in 1998
Museums established in 2002
History museums in Oxfordshire
Automobile museums in England
Barns in England
Aston Martin